Vacuum extraction (VE), also known as ventouse, is a method to assist delivery of a baby using a vacuum device. It is used in the second stage of labor if it has not progressed adequately. It may be an alternative to a forceps delivery and caesarean section.  It cannot be used when the baby is in the breech position or for premature births.  The use of VE is generally safe, but it can occasionally have negative effects on either the mother or the child. The term comes from the French word for "suction cup".

Medical uses

There are several indications to use a vacuum extraction to aid delivery:
 Maternal exhaustion
 Prolonged second stage of labor
 Foetal distress in the second stage of labor, generally indicated by changes in the foetal heart-rate (usually measured on a CTG)
 Maternal illness where prolonged "bearing down" or pushing efforts would be risky (e.g. cardiac conditions, blood pressure, aneurysm, glaucoma). If these conditions are known about before the birth, or are severe, then an elective caesarean section may be performed.

Technique

The woman is placed in the lithotomy position and assists throughout the process by pushing. A suction cup is placed onto the head of the baby and the suction draws the skin from the scalp into the cup. Correct placement of the cup directly over the flexion point, about 3 cm anterior from the occipital (posterior) fontanelle, is critical to the success of a vacuum extraction. Ventouse devices have handles to allow for traction.  When the baby's head is delivered, the device is detached, allowing the birthing attendant and the mother to complete the delivery of the baby.

For proper use of the ventouse, the maternal cervix has to be fully dilated, the head engaged in the birth canal, and the head position known. Preferably the operator of the vacuum extractor needs to be experienced in order to safely perform the procedure. The baby should not be preterm, previously exposed to scalp sampling or failed forceps delivery. If the ventouse attempt fails, it may be necessary to deliver the infant by forceps or caesarean section.

History
In 1849 the Edinburgh professor of obstetrics James Young Simpson, subsequently known for pioneering the use of chloroform in childbirth, designed the Air Tractor which consisted of a metal syringe attached to a soft rubber cup.  This was the earliest known vacuum extractor to assist childbirth but it did not become popular. Swedish professor Tage Malmstrom developed the ventouse, or Malmstrom extractor in the 1950s. Originally made with a metal cap, new materials such as plastics and siliconised rubber have improved the design so that it is now used more than forceps.

Comparisons to other forms of assisted delivery

Positive aspects
 An episiotomy may not be required.
 The mother still takes an active role in the birth.
 No special anesthesia is required.
 There is less potential for maternal trauma compared to forceps and caesarean section.

Negative aspects
 The baby will be left with a temporary lump on its head, known as a chignon.
 There is a possibility of cephalohematoma formation, or subgaleal hemorrhage which can be life-threatening.
 There is a higher risk of failure to deliver the baby than with forceps, and an increased likelihood of perineal trauma.

See also
 Odón device

References

Childbirth
Medical equipment
Obstetrical procedures